Zainal Abidin bin Jamil (born 5 August 1999) is a Malaysian professional footballer who plays as a centre-back for Malaysia Super League side Negeri Sembilan FC.

Club Career 
Zainal Abidin started his youth career at FELDA United F.C. in the 2020 season before joining the PJ City President's Cup squad the following season and being absorbed by P. Maniam in the Super League competition.

He was officially announced as a new Negeri Sembilan FC player on 13 January 2023.

References

External links
 

1999 births
Living people
People from Pahang
Malaysian footballers
Malaysia Super League players
Felda United F.C. players
Petaling Jaya City FC players
Negeri Sembilan FC players
Association football defenders